David Hay Fleming, LL.D. (1849–1931) was a Scottish historian and antiquary.

Biography
Fleming came from St Andrews, a university town in East Fife and was educated at Madras College secondary school. His family had a china and stoneware business, which he sold in 1883 to concentrate on his interests

In his bequest, he left money to found the Hay Fleming Reference library. The collection was a bequest to the town of St Andrews, in 1932, of the library of Fleming, and consists of c13,000 volumes

His grandson was the historian and economist David Fleming.

Works
 Guidebook to St Andrews (1881)
 Charters of St. Andrews (1883),
 Guide to the East Neuk of Fife (1886, 2 vol.s)
 Martyrs and Confessors of St. Andrews (1887),
 Scotland after the Union of the Crowns (1890),
 Mary Queen of Scots (1897),
 Scottish History and Life (3 sections, 1902),
 Story of the Scottish Covenants
 The Discipline of the Reformation
 Critical Reviews
 Knox in the Hands of the Philistines

Quotes
 "Thus it is that history is falsified and good men slandered"

References

External links
 
 
 David Hay Fleming (1849-1931) 
 E-text The Discipline of the Reformation
 David Hay Fleming
 

1849 births
1931 deaths
20th-century Scottish historians
Writers from St Andrews
People educated at Madras College
19th-century Scottish historians